Ayaz Gul is a prominent contemporary poet from Sindh, Pakistan. His works are in the indigenous Sindhi language. He was honoured with the Pride of Performance for literature by President Arif Alvi in 2021.

Early life
Ayaz Gul'z was born Ayaz Ali Dal according to Encyclopædia Sindhiana by Sindhi Language Authority.  He was born to Rajib Ali Dal on 6 March 1959 in Sukkur city of Sukkur District, Sindh, Pakistan. He obtained an MA in Sindhi literature from Shah Abdul Latif University.

Contribution
Ayaz Gul has authored seven books of Sindhi poetry. The published books of his poetry, 'Deenh Dithey Ja Sapna' was written in 1984, followed by 'Dukh Ji Na Pujani Aa' in 1987. He is a professor of the Sindhi language and literature, a Chairman of the Sindhi Department, as well as the director of the Sachal Sarmast chair at the Shah Abdul Latif University, Khairpur. Ayaz Gul is a popular poet of the modern Ghazal poetry style. He has been granted many awards, including the best poet, the Writers Guild Award, an award from the Pakistan Academy of Letters, and an award from the Sindhi Language Authority in Hyderabad, Pakistan. A street in Sukkur city was named in his honor.

Books
 Gul aen Taara (in Sindhi : گل ۽ تارا (ٻارن لاءِ شاعري)) published in 1979

References

Pakistani poets 
Sindhi-language poets
Sindhi people
1959 births
Living people